The poo-uli (Melamprosops phaeosoma)  or black-faced honeycreeper, is an extinct species of passerine bird that was endemic to the island of Maui in Hawaiʻi. It is considered to be a member of the Hawaiian honeycreepers, and is the only member of its genus Melamprosops. It had a black head, brown upper parts and pale gray underparts. This bird inhabited only the wetter, easternmost side of Maui, where it had rapidly decreased in numbers. With extinction threatening, efforts were made to capture birds to enable them to breed in captivity. These efforts were unsuccessful; in 2004, only two known birds remained, and since then, no further birds have been sighted. A 2018 study recommended declaring the species extinct, citing bird population decline patterns and the lack of any confirmed sightings since 2004, and in 2019, the species was declared extinct.

Description
The poo-uli was brown above and grayish-white below, with a broad black mask extending behind the eye. Adults were silvery-gray above the mask, shading into brown at the crown, with a bold, pale patch just behind the mask. Juveniles were similar but buffier below with a smaller mask and without gray above. Most published images of the poouli are of the juvenile plumage.

Discovery
 
The poo-uli was discovered in 1973 when students from the University of Hawaiʻi found the bird on the north-eastern slopes of Haleakalā on the island of Maui. The poo-uli was the first species of Hawaiian honeycreeper to be discovered since 1923.

Taxonomy 
It was dissimilar to other Hawaiian birds; evidence based on DNA analysis supports it as being the most ancient of all the Hawaiian honeycreeper lineages to survive to recent times, its lineage having split off from the rest of the Hawaiian honeycreepers during the late Miocene, about 5.7-5.8 million years ago. The Hawaiian honeycreeper lineage itself only diverged from its common ancestor with Carpodacus around 7.2 million years ago; this would make the divergence of the poouli chronologically closer to the initial divergence from the common ancestor with Carpodacus than to the divergence of most other Hawaiian honeycreeper lineages (aside from the one containing Oreomystis and Paroreomyza, which diverged about a million years after Melamprosops's lineage), most of which diverged after the mid-Pliocene, 3.77 mya. Around the time the poouli lineage originated, Ni'ihau and Kauai were the only two large Hawaiian islands in existence (aside from the then-larger Northwestern Hawaiian Islands), indicating that the po'ouli's lineage most have evolved there and eventually spread to Maui Nui at some point after it first arose in the early Pleistocene, with the recent poouli evolving on and/or eventually becoming restricted to Maui.

Behavior
Its diet consisted mostly of snails, insects, and spiders and it nested in native ‘ōhi‘a lehua (Metrosideros polymorpha) forests. Po’ouli relied more on insect diet because snails' diets required more foraging. “The arrival of lethal mosquito-borne avian malaria in Hawaii exterminated low elevation Po'ouli forcing a population shift to mountain rainforests and possibly a snail diet instead of insects.” An observation was made, as the environment change occurs the physiological and behavioral consequences are seen. This change affects their potential for survival, growth reproduction and distribution.

Status and conservation

Fossil show that the Po'ouli once lived on Maui at low elevations in dry/mesic habitats on a likely diet of native tree snails and insects. The arrival of lethal mosquito-borne avian malaria in Hawaii exterminated low elevation Po'ouli forcing a population shift to mountain rainforests and possibly a snail diet instead of insects. When the species was first discovered, 100–200 poo-uli were estimated to exist. There were only 76 birds per km2. By 1981, there were only 15 birds per km2. By 1985, there were only 8 per km2. That meant that from 1975, when it was first discovered, to 1985, only ten years later, the population had dropped by over 90 percent. In the 1980s, the poo-uli disappeared from the easternmost part of its range and was only found in the western branch of the Hanawi Stream.

To preserve the poo-uli and other endangered fauna and flora, the State of Hawaii established the  Hanawi Natural Area Reserve. This connected several protected areas to make one larger protective area. This protection effort was only possible due to the work of several groups: the government, Maui County, the National Park Service, The Nature Conservancy, and several private companies. The land was fenced off and by June 1996 they began to clear out the pigs from the closed areas. Four years and 202 pigs later, the poo-uli pen was completely cleared of pigs. As more pigs were removed from the other two pens, the population of native species that lived there, e.g. the Maui parrotbill and ʻākohekohe, rose slightly faster than they otherwise would have. Rats, cats, and goats were still being removed from the poo-uli pen.
 
By 1997, only three individuals were known to exist. These had home ranges within the Hanawi Natural Area Reserve and the adjacent Haleakala National Park.

In 2002, one of these, a female, was captured and taken to a male's home range in an attempt to get them to breed. There was also a ten-day expedition in 2004. The goal of this was to capture all three birds and bring them to a bird conservation center on the island, in the hope they would produce offspring.

On September 9, 2004, one of the remaining birds, a male, was captured and taken to the Maui Bird Conservation Center in Olinda, in an attempt to breed the bird in captivity. However, biologists could not find a mate for the male before it died on November 26, 2004.

It is uncertain whether the other two birds that remained at the time were a male and female, or both the same sex. Since 2004, extensive surveys failed to locate these or other individuals of this species, indicating a possible extinction. However, it remained listed as critically endangered by BirdLife International (and thereby the IUCN) until additional surveys had confirmed its extinction beyond reasonable doubt. Tissue samples were taken from the male captured in 2004 for possible future cloning.

The dramatic population decline has been attributed to a number of factors, including habitat loss, mosquito-borne diseases, predation by pigs, rats, cats, and small Asian mongooses, and a decline in the native tree snails that the poouli relied on for food.

In 2019, after continued habitat degradation, presence of disease and invasive species, and a long period with no sightings, the IUCN classified this bird as Extinct. On September 29, 2021, the U.S. Fish and Wildlife Service declared the Poʻouli extinct.

See also 
 List of recently extinct birds
 List of extinct animals of the Hawaiian Islands
 Holocene extinction

Footnotes

References

External links

 Species factsheet – BirdLife International
Article in the Honolulu Star-Bulletin about the poouli
 BBC storyAttempts to save the Poʻouli, The Guardian 4 May 2022.

Carduelinae
Hawaiian honeycreepers
Biota of Oahu
Endemic birds of Hawaii
Extinct birds of Hawaii
Birds described in 1974
Taxa named by Tonnie Casey
Taxa named by James Jacobi